This is a list of all cricketers who have played first-class, List A or Twenty20 cricket for Hyderabad cricket team. Seasons given are first and last seasons; the player did not necessarily play in all the intervening seasons. Players in bold have played international cricket.

Last updated at the end of the 2019/20 season.

A
 Ali Abbas, 1939/40-1950/51
 Mohammad Abdul Hai, 1968/69-1975/76
 Abdullah, 1956/57
 Syed Abid Ali, 1959/60-1978/79
 Akhil P Mohan, 1998/99
 Alfred Absolem, 2005/06-2013/14
 VH Achar, 1998/99
 Himalay Agarwal, 2014/15-2019/20
 Tanmay Agarwal, 2014/15-2019/20
 Abrar Ahmed, 1990/91-1991/92
 Anwar Ahmed, 2011/12-2015/16
 Faiz Ahmed, 1999/00-2003/04
 Ghulam Ahmed, 1939/40-1958/59
 Habeeb Ahmed, 2007/08-2016/17
 Habib Ahmed, 1955/56-1967/68
 Jamil Ahmed, 1930/31
 Mushtaq Ahmed, 1963/64-1964/65
 Shaik Ahmed, 1991/92
 Shoaib Ahmed, 2007/08-2010/11
 Ushaq Ahmed, 1934/35-1946/47
 Edulji Aibara, 1934/35-1958/59
 Faridoon Aibara, 1954/55-1957/58
 Annabathula Akash, 2015/16-2016/17
 Shahid Akbar, 1976/77-1983/84
 Afzal Ali, 1954/55-1956/57
 Amir Ali, 1957/58-1960/61
 Asghar Ali, 1942/43-1948/49
 Azmath Ali, 1979/80-1981/82
 Hamid Ali, 1954/55
 Hyder Ali, 1931/32-1941/42
 Jaweed Ali, 2015/16-2019/20
 Miraj Ali, 1931/32-1936/37
 Gangam Anikethreddy, 2019/20
 Balchander Anirudh, 2014/15-2016/17
 Jaggulal Anshul, 2014/15
 Dayanand Archaye, 1936/37
 Mungala Arjun, 2005/06-2012/13
 Dharmapuri Arvind, 1995/96
 Gangashetty Arvind Kumar, 1994/95-2003/04
 P. R. Ashokanand, 1957/58
 Rashid Ashraf, 1990/91-1995/96
 Arshad Ayub, 1979/80-1993/94
 Abdul Azeem, 1979/80-1994/95
 Mohammad Azharuddin, 1981/82-1999/00
 [Mohammed Abdul Rehman],1994/95/96

B
 Subramaniam Badrinath, 2016/17
 Abbas Ali Baig, 1954/55-1975/76
 Faiz Baig, 1980/81-1983/84
 Mazhar Ali Baig, 1963/64-1966/67
 Murtuza Ali Baig, 1958/59-1970/71
 Rehmat Baig, 1969/70
 Abdul Baseer, 2009/10-2010/11
 Bashiruddin, 1930/31-1931/32
 Akash Bhandari, 2009/10-2019/20
 AR Bhupathi, 1940/41-1954/55
 Neeraj Bist, 2009/10-2011/12
 M. V. Bobjee, 1950/51-1953/54
 Rahul Buddhi, 2019/20
 Ernest Burdett, 1932/33

C
 Katikaneni Chakravarthy, 1994/95
 KSK Chaitanya, 2018/19
 CR Chandran, 1975/76-1977/78
 A. Chatterjee, 1984/85
 Vivian Chiodetti, 1931/32

D
 Noel David, 1992/93-2001/02
 Deshmukh, 1930/31
 Dhansukh, 1935/36
 G Dinesh Kumar, 1993/94
 Feredune Dittia, 1940/41-1949/50
 Minoo Dittia, 1946/47-1953/54
 SF Driver, 1932/33

E
 Lyn Edwards, 1969/70

F
 Fazluddin, 1952/53-1954/55

G
 Mohammad Ghouse Baba, 2000/01-2004/05
 Roy Gilchrist, 1962/63 (played international cricket for West Indies)
 Govindaswami, 1930/31-1932/33
 Ajay Dev Goud, 2018/19-2019/20
 Vijay Goud, 2008/09
 Devraj Govindraj, 1964/65-1974/75

H
 Syed Mohammad Hadi, 1930/31-1940/41
 Nagesh Hammond, 1969/70-1976/77
 Riazul Haq, 1930/31-1938/39
 A I Harrsha, 2014/15
 P Hari Mohan, 1985/86-1986/87
 K Hariprasad, 1981/82-1983/84
 Mehdi Hasan, 2011/12-2019/20
 S Himayatullah, 1930/31-1934/35
 Hisamuddin, 1945/46-1946/47
 Ahmed Hussain, 1931/32
 Ali Hussain, 1943/44-1953/54
 Mohammad Hussain, 1930/31-1942/43
 Mumtaz Hussain, 1967/68-1977/78
 Sabir Hussain, 1962/63
 Tafazzul Hussain, 1932/33
 Zakir Hussain, 1988/89-1991/92

I
 Iftikharuddin, 1961/62-1964/65
 Asif Iqbal, 1959/60-1960/61 (played international cricket for Pakistan)

J
 Chelluri Jaikumar, 1989/90-1991/92
 M. Jairam, 1954/55-1965/66
 M. L. Jaisimha, 1954/55-1976/77
 Vivek Jaisimha, 1982/83-1993/94
 Kenia Jayantilal, 1968/69-1978/79
 Parth Jhala, 2012/13
 Ronald Joy, 1931/32
 Saad Bin Jung, 1978/79-1980/81
 P Jyothiprasad, 1974/75-1984/85

K
 Karthikeya Kak, 2018/19
 Kaleem-ul-Haq, 1962/63-1968/69
 Kanakasabhapathi, 1941/42
 Mohammed Khader, 2007/08-2013/14
 Ibrahim Khaleel, 2002/03-2014/15 (played international cricket for United States of America)
 Khalil-ur-Rehman, 1959/60
 Abbas Ali Khan, 1992/93
 Ehteshamuddin Ali Khan, 1984/85-1991/92
 Fateh Khan, 1930/31
 Fazal Ahmed Khan, 1931/32
 Habib Khan, 1956/57-1968/69
 Ibrahim Khan, 1935/36-1954/55
 Isa Khan, 1934/35-1940/41
 Mohammad Ali Khan, 1949/50
 Nasir Ali Khan, 1949/50-1951/52
 Nizam Yar Khan, 1947/48-1950/51
 Salamat Ali Khan, 1988/89
 Sardar Khan, 1970/71-1981/82
 Waheed Yar Khan, 1960/61-1968/69
 Zahid Ali Khan, 1970/71
 Bharat Khanna, 1932/33-1952/53
 Ravi Kiran, 2011/12-2019/20
 Sangani Kiran Kumar, 1995/96-1996/97
 Nand Kishore, 1994/95-2004/05
 Vivek Krishna, 2009/10-2010/11
 S. Krishnamurthi, 1951/52
 BN Krishnamurthy, 1955/56-1961/62
 Pochiah Krishnamurthy, 1967/68-1978/79
 Abhinav Kumar, 2004/05-2012/13
 Mahendra Kumar, 1960/61-1966/67
 Pawan Kumar, 1984/85
 Pawan Kumar, 1997/98-2001/02
 Pawan Kumar, 1995/96
 Praneeth Kumar, 2012/13-2014/15
 Sarvesh Kumar, 2007/08-2009/10

L
 Jagdish Lal, 1944/45
 G Laxman, 1966/67
 V. V. S. Laxman, 1992/93-2012/13
 Zahid Lodhi, 1938/39
 Sinderraj Lokenderraj, 1961/62

M
 VG Mache, 1936/37-1938/39
 A. Majid Khan,  1960/92
 Jamalpur Mallikarjun, 2018/19-2019/20
 Daniel Manohar, 1997/98-2007/08
 V Manohar, 1984/85-1987/88
 SM Mazhar, 1948/49
 Syed Meeraj, 1993/94-1997/98
 Danthala Venkata Meher Baba, 1978/79
 Marzban Mehta, 1952/53
 Naushir Mehta, 1967/68-1976/77
 Sorabji Mehta, 1936/37-1946/47
 Chama Milind, 2012/13-2019/20
 F Mistry, 1943/44
 Gul Mohammad, 1951/52-1954/55 (played international cricket for India and Pakistan)
 Bhupait Mohan, 1970/71
 Lalit Mohan, 1959/60-1963/64
 Lalith Mohan, 2007/08-2015/16
 Vijay Mohanraj, 1979/80-1994/95
 Mohammad Mohiuddin, 1994/95-1998/99
 Mohammad Muddassir, 2016/17-2018/19
 V. M. Muddiah, 1953/54
 Sharadh Mudiraj, 2016/17
 Venkat Murthy, 1984/85
 Muralidharan, 1953/54
 B Muthukrishna, 1977/78

N
 Mohammad Nadeemuddin, 2002/03-2004/05
 Khaja Naeemuddin, 1969/70
 Shashank Nag, 2003/04-2010/11
 Pagadala Naidu, 2009/10-2015/16
 K Naik, 1938/39
 M. V. Narasimha Rao, 1971/72-1988/89
 Nasiruddin, 1951/52-1955/56
 Mehboob Nausheer, 1956/57-1958/59
 V Navinatham, 1951/52-1953/54
 C. K. Nayudu, 1931/32
 Shatish Nellury, 1994/95
 Pagadala Niranjan, 2004/05-2009/10
 Moses Nityanand, 1980/81

O
 Pragyan Ojha, 2004/05-2017/18

P
 Komadur Padmanabhan, 1957/58-1960/61
 Anoop Pai, 2005/06-2010/11
 Mansoor Ali Khan Pataudi, 1965/66-1975/76
 Babubhai Patel, 1939/40-1940/41
 Krishnakant Patel, 1951/52-1954/55
 Arun Paul, 1983/84-1988/89
 Vijay Paul, 1974/75-1982/83
 Sunil Phillips, 1984/85
 N Prahalad, 1970/71-1974/75
 Durga Prasad, 1944/45-1950/51
 Vanka Pratap, 1991/92-2001/02
 N Premkumar, 1962/63-1971/72
 Danny Dereck Prince, 2007/08-2016/17

Q
 Khlid Qayyum, 1976/77-1989/90
 Syed Quadri, 2002/03-2015/16
 Abdul Ela Qureshi, 2018/19
 Asadullah Qureshi, 1935/36-1948/49
 Ghulam Qureshi, 1936/37-1954/55
 Qutubuddin, 1942/43

R
 Arif Rabbani, 1949/50-1957/58
 Ahmed Rafiuddin, 1957/58-1958/59
 S Rahim, 1947/48
 Doddapaneni Rushi Raj, 2006/07-2009/10
 Sundeep Rajan, 2011/12-2013/14
 Alladi Raju, 1977/78-1979/80
 Prabhakar Raju, 1965/66-1966/67
 Venkatapathy Raju, 1985/86-2004/05
 K Ramakrishna, 1949/50-1960/61
 M. V. Ramanamurthy, 1986/87-1993/94
 Kartik Ramaswamy, 1998/99
 Pottimuthyala Ramesh Kumar, 1989/90-1992/93
 Venkatraman Ramnarayan, 1975/76-1979/80
 Pondicharry Rangaraj, 1989/90
 Bhagya Rao, 1950/51
 Ganesh Rao, 1932/33
 Padma Rao, 1952/53
 RK Rao, 1930/31-1942/43
 Sanjiva Rao, 1942/43-1957/58
 Tata Rao, 1934/35
 Venkatesh Rao, 1955/56-1966/67
 A Raoof, 1946/47-1947/48
 Timothy Ravi Kumar, 1997/98
 Dwaraka Ravi Teja, 2005/06-2014/15
 Ambati Rayudu, 2001/02-2019/20
 Rohit Rayudu, 2016/17-2019/20
 Akshath Reddy, 2009/10-2019/20
 Ashish Reddy, 2008/09-2018/19
 Chaitanya Reddy, 2017/18-2019/20
 Dillip Reddy, 1979/80
 Fathima Reddy, 1999/00
 Gajanan Reddy, 1992/93
 Gautham Reddy, 2008/09
 Inder Shekar Reddy, 2001/02-2010/11
 Kaushik Reddy, 2004/05-2006/07
 Naveen Reddy, 2006/07
 Papi Reddy, 1993/94-1995/96
 Prateek Reddy, 2019/20
 Santosh Reddy, 1966/67-1970/71
 Shashidhar Reddy, 2019/20
 Yathin Reddy, 2015/16-2016/17
 Shaikh Riazuddin, 1993/94-1999/00
 Maurice Robinson, 1943/44
 Ronald Rodrigues, 2007/08-2008/09

S
 Rohit Sabharwal, 2001/02-2006/07
 RH Sabir, 1964/65
 K Sainath, 1978/79-1982/83
 Palakodeti Sairam, 2013/14-2019/20
 Sultan Saleem, 1964/65-1975/76
 Bavanaka Sandeep, 2010/11-2019/20
 Parth Satwalkar, 1999/00-2000/01
 RV Seshadri, 1954/55
 Shahabuddin, 1931/32
 Fahad Shahnawaz, 2004/05
 Mohammed Shakeer, 2006/07-2008/09
 Shiv Shanker, 2008/09
 Vishal Sharma, 2007/08-2016/17
 Jyothi Shetty, 1987/88-1988/89
 Amol Shinde, 2005/06-2017/18
 K Shivaraj, 1958/59-1959/60
 Poll Shyamsunder, 1957/58
 Iqbal Siddiqui, 1995/96
 Anirudh Singh, 2000/01-2010/11
 Kanwaljit Singh, 1980/81-2000/01
 A. G. Kripal Singh, 1965/66
 Maheshwar Singh, 1972/73-1977/78
 PR Man Singh, 1965/66
 Narender Pal Singh, 1993/94-2006/07
 Paramveer Singh, 2007/08-2012/13
 Rahul Singh, 2012/13-2013/14
 Rajkumar Singh, 1948/49
 Yudhvir Singh, 2019/20
 Youraj Singh, 1992/93-1999/00
 Mohammed Siraj, 2015/16-2019/20
 C Sridhar, 1982/83-1984/85
 M. V. Sridhar, 1988/89-1999/00
 Ramakrishnan Sridhar, 1989/90-2000/01
 G. Srinivas, 1997/98
 Mangalapally Srinivas, 1996/97-2001/02
 G Srinivasan, 1992/93
 M. S. Sriram, 1954/55-1961/62
 Tirumalasetti Suman, 2002/03-2015/16
 Kolla Sumanth, 2012/13-2019/20
 D Suresh, 1986/87-1988/89
 Gevin Surma, 1987/88
 R. A. Swaroop, 1987/88-1994/95

T
 Ravi Teja, 2016/17-2019/20
 Tanay Thyagarajan, 2016/17-2019/20
 Benjamin Thomas, 2009/10-2016/17
 F Toorkey, 1934/35-1938/39
 Sudeep Tyagi, 2015/16-2017/18

V
 Vajubha, 1936/37-1941/42
 Harsha Vardhan, 2014/15
 Tilak Varma, 2018/19-2019/20
 L Vasan, 1977/78-1980/81
 Venkataswami, 1934/35-1943/44
 P Venugopal, 1996/97
 Hanuma Vihari, 2009/10-2015/16
 Vijay Kumar, 2000/01
 Devishetty Vinay Kumar, 1996/97-2006/07
 Sankinani Vishnuvardhan, 1994/95-2004/05

W
 Abdul Wahab, 1976/77-1982/83
 Wahiduddin, 1947/48
 John Wilson, 1930/31

Y
 Ashwin Yadav, 2007/08-2010/11
 Arjun Yadav, 1999/00-2012/13
 Rajesh Yadav, 1984/85-1993/94
 Santosh Yadav, 1995/96-2007/08
 Shivaji Yadav, 1994/95-2004/05
 Shivlal Yadav, 1977/78-1989/90
 Mohammad Yusuf, 1950/51

Z
 Bobby Zahiruddin, 1938/39-1944/45

References

Lists of Indian cricketers

Hyderabad, India-related lists